Mike Boots is a former government official who served as Chair of the Council on Environmental Quality during part of Barack Obama's presidency. He served in the position from February 2014 – March 2015.

Boots grew up in Los Angeles and graduated with an M.P.A. from the Maxwell School of Citizenship and Public Affairs at Syracuse University and received a B.A. in Communications from the University of California Los Angeles. Before joining the Obama administration's Council on Environmental Quality as a staffer at the beginning of the new administration's time in office he worked at environmental advocacy group SeaWeb.

Boots is the Executive Vice President at Bill Gates funded Breakthrough Energy.

References

External links

 Breakthrough Energy Bio

Year of birth missing (living people)
Living people
People from Los Angeles
University of California, Los Angeles alumni
American environmentalists
Activists from California
Maxwell School of Citizenship and Public Affairs alumni
Obama administration personnel